is a university in Tokyo, Japan. The university grew out of the leading boys private high school, Musashi Junior and Senior High School, first established by businessman Nezu Kaichirō in 1922.

The university has faculties of economics established in 1949, humanities established in 1969, and sociology established in 1997, as well as three graduate schools.

References

External links 

Official site 
Musashi University Webpage 
 Musashi University Library 

Private universities and colleges in Japan
Nerima
Universities and colleges in Tokyo